Sumeet Passi (born 12 September 1994) is an Indian footballer who plays as a forward or defender for Indian Super League club East Bengal and the India national team.

Club career

Early career
Passi began playing the game at a very young age and thanks his father, Jai Prakash Passi who is a former Railways player, as the man who motivated him to become a dedicated footballer. Passi than began his footballing career as a training with Chandigarh Football Academy. In 2007 it was announced that Passi would be the captain of the Chandigarh football team at the under-14s level for the 53rd National School Games.

Senior career
Passi made his professional debut in football on 2 February 2013 against East Bengal in which he came on in the 77th minute for Dhanpal Ganesh as Pailan Arrows lost the match 2–1.

Jamshedpur
On 23 July 2017, Passi was selected in the 12th round of the 2017–18 ISL Players Draft by Jamshedpur for the 2017–18 Indian Super League season. He made his debut for the club on 18 February 2018 against Chennaiyin. He started the match and played 90 minutes as Jamshedpur drew 1–1.

East Bengal
In August 2022, Indian Super League club East Bengal announced the signing of Passi, on a one-year deal.

On 22 August, he made his debut against Indian Navy in the Durand Cup, which ended in a 0–0 stalemate. On 28 August, he scored a defining own goal against Kolkata derby rival ATK Mohun Bagan, when a seemingly harmless corner bounced awkwardly in front of him, to deflect inside. Six days later, he scored his first two goals for the club against Mumbai City, in a thrilling 4–3 win.

International career
Passi made his debut for India against Laos on 2 June 2016. He scored his first international goal against Laos on 7 June 2016 with an assist from Jackichand Singh.

Career statistics

Club

International

International goals
Scores and results list India's goal tally first

Honours

India
 SAFF Championship runner-up: 2018

References

External links 
 
 Sumeet Passi at Jamshedpur FC

1994 births
Living people
People from Yamunanagar district
Footballers from Haryana
I-League players
Indian Super League players
Association football forwards
Indian footballers
Indian Arrows players
Sporting Clube de Goa players
NorthEast United FC players
DSK Shivajians FC players
Jamshedpur FC players
India youth international footballers
2019 AFC Asian Cup players
India international footballers
RoundGlass Punjab FC players